Peter Cameron (born November 29, 1959) is an American novelist and short-story writer. Several of his works have been adapted into films.

Life and career
Cameron was born and raised in the Pompton Plains section of Pequannock Township, New Jersey. He graduated in English literature in 1982 from Hamilton College. Cameron lived in Pompton Plains, London, and, later, New York City.

In 1983, he published his first short story (Memorial Day) in The New Yorker; he then continued to contribute to the magazine in the following years. His first book was a collection of short stories entitled One Way or Another, published by Harper & Row in 1986. His debut novel Leap Year was published by Harper & Row in 1990. His second novel, The Weekend, was edited in 1994 by Farrar, Straus and Giroux, and adapted as the Brian Skeet film of the same name released in November 2000. In 1997, Farrar, Straus and Giroux published Cameron's next novel, Andorra, and The City of Your Final Destination in 2002, (which in 2009 was adapted into a film of the same name directed by James Ivory). In October 2007, Cameron's young adult novel Someday This Pain Will Be Useful to You was published, and in October 2012 it was adapted into a film of the same name. In March 2012, he published Coral Glynn. His last novel, What Happens at Night, was published by Catapult in August 2020.

In addition to his work as a writer, he has taught at Columbia, Yale and Sarah Lawrence College. Between 1990 and 1998, he worked for the Lambda Legal Defense and Education Fund. In 2020, he founded Wallflower Press, whose name had to change in January 2014 to Shrinking Violet Press due to a rights conflict with Columbia University.

Influences
Cameron was influenced by authors such as Rose Macaulay, Barbara Pym and Margaret Drabble, borrowing their aptitude for probing individual lives.

List of works

Novels

Leap Year (1990)
The Weekend (1994)
Andorra (1997)
The City of Your Final Destination (2002)
Someday This Pain Will Be Useful to You (2007)
Coral Glynn (2012)
What Happens at Night (2020)

Collections

One Way or Another (1986)
Far-flung (1991)
The Half You Don't Know (1997)

References 

1959 births
Living people
Hamilton College (New York) alumni
People from Pequannock Township, New Jersey
American male novelists
Novelists from New Jersey
The New Yorker people
20th-century American short story writers
21st-century American novelists
20th-century American novelists
American male short story writers
21st-century American male writers
21st-century American short story writers
20th-century American male writers